Régis Laspalès (born 25 February 1957 in Paris) is a French comedian and actor best known for his collaboration with Philippe Chevallier.

Career
He is known for his particular phrasing and is imitated by many performers.

Filmography

Theater

References

External links 
 
Official site

1957 births
Living people
Male actors from Paris
French comedians
Lycée Montaigne (Paris) alumni
French male film actors
French male stage actors
French male television actors